The Berlin key (also known as, German, Schließzwangschlüssel, or, in English, forced-locking key) is a key for a type of door lock. It was designed to force people to close and lock their doors, usually a main entrance door or gate leading into a common yard or tenement block. The key was a solution to the problem of access via communal doors of such blocks (Mietskaserne) as early as the 19th century.

Mechanism 
A Berlin key has two key blades, at each end of the key, rather than the usual single blade. The key is used like this:

 Unlock the door from the outside
 Push the key through the lock, so that the key protrudes from the inside of the door
 Open the now unlocked door and enter
 Close the door and lock the door with the key, which now protrudes from the inside of the door
 Take the key from the lock

The mechanism makes it impossible to forget to lock the door without also forgetting the key in the lock. Also, locking an open door is usually not possible.

Invented by the Berliner locksmith Johannes Schweiger, the Berlin key was massively produced by the Albert Kerfin & Co company starting in 1912. With the advent of more recent locking technologies, this kind of lock and key is becoming less common. It was estimated in 2005, that 8000–10000 are still in use today in Berlin, Germany.

Representations 
The key is subject of the book The Berlin Key by science and technology studies professor Bruno Latour. According to Latour, this technical object is a decisive agent that can mediate the relationship between the tenants, users, and visitors of a building. He also proposed that the key performs a "program of action" or a "script", which is "Please bolt the door behind you during the night and never during the day". This indicates two meanings for the term hardware in terms of the key as a mechanism — a door lock and information processor. 

Another interpretation noted that the key reveals two social dichotomies as it draws the line between guarded and unguarded resources as well as between inhabitants and strangers. The Berlin key was also used to reference the Berlin Wall when it opened in 1989.

References

Further reading
 The Berlin Key or How to Do things with Words

Locksmithing

ja:鍵 (道具)#ベルリン錠